So Damn Happy may refer to:

 So Damn Happy (Loudon Wainwright III album), 2003
 So Damn Happy (Aretha Franklin album), 2003